Evon McInnnis (born 2 January 1980) is a former cricketer born in Jamaica who played for Jamaica and then Central Districts in New Zealand.

References
 Cricinfo profile

1980 births
Living people
People from Saint Elizabeth Parish
Jamaican expatriates in New Zealand
Jamaican cricketers
Central Districts cricketers
Jamaica cricketers